British Amphibious Airlines was a British airline that operated a seaplane service between Blackpool and the Isle of Man in 1932 and 1933.

History
The airline was formed on 4 February 1932 in Blackpool to exploit an agreement to use the sea and foreshore at Blackpool for conducting flight in amphibious flying boats.

During the summer of 1932 the airline operated a service between Blackpool and the Isle of Man using a Saro Cutty Sark named Progress which could carry four passengers. The aircraft was based at Squires Gate Airport but picked up passengers on the foreshore and alighted in Douglas harbour on the Isle of Man, if the sea conditions were bad they used Ronaldsway Airport. Although the first to operate a service to the Isle of Man they were in competition with the Isle of Man Air Services who operated from Liverpool.

The first year they carried 348 passengers on the service, during 1933 the service was only operated on three days a week and carried only 130 passengers. The airline tried to acquire a larger Saro Cloud aircraft but were thwarted by the owners of Saunders-Roe who wanted to run their own service to the Isle of Man so British Amphibious stopped operating the service.

See also
 List of defunct airlines of the United Kingdom
Ronald Monk bought a seaplane and went from London to Blackpool to give rides to people on the beach at one of the first British holiday place Someone approached him about taking people to the TT races in the Isle of Man, which he did then someone asked him to take a group to Liverpool.  This became the first internal airline in the UK.  Ronald Monk did not have the money to cope with the
 demand so Saunders came and took over.  Ronald Monk then went to Egypy with Misr Airlines until the war broke out, when he returned to the UK and rejoined the RAF.  Ronald Monk was then 36 and was sent to South Africa to train pilots.  I believe his licence to do this was no 8.
After the war he started up Gibraltar Airways for BEA, and then became controller of Aviation for the Iraq Petroleum Company.

References

Defunct airlines of the United Kingdom
Airlines established in 1932
Airlines disestablished in 1933
Defunct seaplane operators